Charadra coyopa is a moth of the family Noctuidae. It is known only from the holotype specimen from the Mexico City area.

The length of the forewings is 18.9 mm for males. The collection date indicates a flight period in January.

Etymology
The name is derived from Mayan mythology. Coyopa is the ruler of the sound of thunder, and the brother of Cakulha. It is a noun in apposition.

References

Pantheinae
Moths described in 2010